MT Haven, formerly Amoco Milford Haven, was a VLCC (very large crude carrier), leased to Troodos Shipping (a company run by Loucas Haji-Ioannou and his son Stelios Haji-Ioannou). In 1991, while loaded with 144,000 tonnes (1 million barrels) of crude oil, the ship exploded, caught fire and sank off the coast of Genoa, Italy, killing six Cypriot crew and flooding the Mediterranean with up to 50,000 tonnes of crude oil. It broke in two and sank after burning for three days.

History
Amoco Milford Haven was built by Astilleros Españoles S.A. in Cádiz, Spain, the sister ship of Amoco Cadiz, which sank in 1978. Launched in 1973, she worked various routes shipping crude oil from the Persian Gulf. In 1988 she was hit by a missile in the Gulf during the Iran–Iraq War. Extensively refitted in Singapore, she was sold to ship brokers who leased her to Troodos Shipping, for whom she ran from Iran's Kharg Island to the Mediterranean.

Accident

Having transferred 80,000 tonnes, the ship disconnected from the platform for a routine internal transfer operation, to allow oil to be pumped from two side-holds into a central one.

In later testimony, First Officer Donatos Lilis said: "I heard a very loud noise, like iron bars beating against each other. Perhaps the cover of a pump had broken. Then there was an awful explosion." Five crewmen died immediately, as fire broke out and oil started leaking from the hull as the plates overheated. As the fire engulfed the ship, flames rose 100 m high and, after a series of further explosions occurred, between 30 and 40,000 tons of oil poured into the sea.

On day two, MT Haven was to be towed close to the coast, in a bid to reduce the coastal area affected and make intervention easier. As the bow slipped beneath the surface, a steel cable was passed around the rudder and tugs applied towing pressure. But it was quickly clear that the ship had broken its back, and the bow section came to rest in 450 m of water. On 14 April, the 250 m long main body sank  from the coast, between Arenzano and Cogoleto.

Shipwreck

After the wreck was declared safe, a mini sub diver found that the stern section had grazed a rocky spur, though not hard enough to open any new holes in the hull, and come to rest at an angle on the flat, sandy seabed. He reported that most of the remaining 80,000 tons of crude had burnt or was at the surface. Most of the oil on the surface could be sucked up, and what remained below was in a solid state. For the next 12 years the Mediterranean coast of Italy and France was polluted, especially around Genoa and southern France.

It is a popular tourist attraction with recreational scuba divers .

Court case

Background and allegations
At the centre of the case was the allegation that Lucas and Stelios had kept their vessel, the Troodos-owned Cyprus-flagged Haven, in such disrepair that she exploded. According to news items it is also alleged that the tanker was scrapped after being hit by an Exocet missile during the Iran–Iraq War and should not have been put back into operation. Prosecutors had asked for seven-year sentences for manslaughter against both father and son, and two years and four months against Christos Dovles, a former director of the shipping firm.

Outcome
Lucas and Stelios were later acquitted after three retrials (of which 2002 was the last) and much controversy, with subsequent appeals and demands for compensation also thrown out.<ref
  name="observ"/> Stelios was quoted after the trial: "My main comment is to ask why it took so long to clear innocent people of these terrible charges."<ref
  name="cyprus">
</ref>

Reception
Italy's Environment Ministry under-secretary said he was "greatly embittered" by the verdict, saying, "The victims, the relatives and the marine environment that were all seriously damaged are left without convincing answers."
The Italian president of the World Wildlife Fund, Grazia Francescato, said in a statement that she was disgusted with Stelios' conduct. She drew similarities with the Moby Prince disaster, an unrelated collision in which 140 people died on a ferry just off the nearby city of Livorno, and the acquittal of four men on charges of manslaughter.

NUMAST, the union that represents merchant officers, described the acquittal as "depressing", a sentiment also expressed by the International Transport Workers' Federation. Only by making ship owners accountable for the state of vessels under their control would substandard ships be eliminated, Andrew Linington, head of communications at NUMAST said. "Even when ship owners were clearly linked with a ship that did not meet acceptable standards it seems no action will be taken," Linington said.

See also
List of oil spills
, a bulk carrier wrecked at the mouth of the Port of Genoa in 1970

References

External links
 Italian site about the tragedy
 Cyprus News Item
 Wreck of the Haven at www.relitti.it

1973 ships
1991 in Italy
Maritime incidents in Italy
Maritime incidents in 1987
Maritime incidents in 1988
Maritime incidents in 1991
Oil tankers
Oil spills in Europe
Ships built in Spain
Shipwrecks in the Mediterranean Sea
Amoco
Ships of BP
1991 disasters in Italy